Kumanova may refer to one of the following

 A Bulgarian surname, the feminine form from "Kumanov"
 Ahinora Kumanova, a Bulgarian-German singer
 Albanian name for Kumanovo, a city in the Republic of Macedonia